Harbhajan Singh "Harry" Lali (born August 10, 1955) is a former MLA in the Canadian province of British Columbia.

Biography
Lali spent eleven summers working in the forestry industry, and obtained a Bachelor of Arts Degree in History and South Asia Area Studies from the University of Victoria and the University of British Columbia, where he helped establish the Chair of Punjabi and Sikh Studies. He served one term as City Councillor in Merritt starting in 1988, and was an employment counsellor for the Merritt Outreach Program from 1986 until 1991.

He is a member of the British Columbia New Democratic Party and the longest serving South Asian Member of a Legislative Assembly in Canadian history, surpassing his former colleague Moe Sihota in June 2010.

First term in the Legislative Assembly

In the 1991 election he was elected to the Legislative Assembly as MLA for Yale-Lillooet, and was re-elected in 1996. Lali served as the Minister of Transportation and Highways from 1998 to 2001 under three different Premiers. For the 2001 election, he chose not to run for re-election.

Second term in the Legislative Assembly
He returned to the Assembly by winning his riding in the 2005 election ahead of BC Liberal Party candidate Lloyd Forman and Green Party candidate Michael McLean. Lali ran again elected in the newly created riding of Fraser-Nicola in the 2009 election and was re-elected over BC Liberal Party candidate Ella Brown.

Leadership bid
In December 2010, following a BC NDP caucus revolt of which Lali was a part of, BC NDP Leader Carole James announced she would step down as Leader of the NDP. On January 7, 2011, Lali announced he was running to be leader of the opposition. But less than a month later, Lali dropped out of the race saying that he was unable to come up with the funds necessary to mount a credible campaign.

Defeat
Lali ran for re-election but suffered a surprising defeat to BC Liberal Candidate Jackie Tegart in his riding of Fraser-Nicola in the 2013 election, Lali blamed his defeat on a poorly run provincial campaign and a dearth of NDP supporters showing up at the polls because he was considered a shoo-in cost him the riding.

Attempt to return to the Legislative Assembly
On May 17, 2016, Lali announced he would again run for the British Columbia New Democratic Party nomination for Fraser-Nicola in a bid to reclaim his seat. He was challenged by Aaron Sam, a Lower Nicola Indian Band chief. Lali ended up winning the nomination but losing his re-match to Tegart.

Electoral record

References

Living people
1956 births
21st-century Canadian politicians
20th-century Canadian politicians
British Columbia New Democratic Party MLAs
Canadian politicians of Punjabi descent
Canadian social workers
Members of the Executive Council of British Columbia
British Columbia municipal councillors
Canadian politicians of Indian descent